Bengaluru Bulls (BGB) is a Kabaddi team based in Bengaluru that plays in the Pro Kabaddi League. The team were champions in Season 6 and are led by Mahender singh and coached by Randhir Singh. The team is owned by Kosmik Global Media. Bulls play their home matches at the Kanteerava Indoor Stadium. Bulls are one of the most successful teams in PKL history after winning the trophy for the first time by defeating the Gujarat FortuneGiants in the 2018–19 season. The team was also the runner-up to U Mumba in 2015 and reached the semifinals in the inaugural 2014 season.

Current squad

Seasons

Season I

Bulls secured fourth place in the first season.

Season II

Bengaluru Bulls finished second in the second season.

Season III

Season IV

Season V

Season VI

Season VII

Season VIII

Season IX

Records

Overall results Pro Kabbaddi season

By opposition
''Note: Table lists in alphabetical order.

Sponsors

References 

Pro Kabaddi League teams
Sport in Bangalore
2014 establishments in Karnataka
Kabaddi clubs established in 2014